Homunculus, Vol. 1 is the fourth studio album by Peter Frohmader, released independently in 1987.

Track listing

Personnel
Adapted from the Homunculus, Vol. 1 liner notes.
 Peter Frohmader – electronics, musical arrangement, production, engineering, mixing, cover art, design, photography
 The Homunculus Orchestra – instruments
 Birgit Metzger – vocals

Release history

References

External links 
 Homunculus, Vol. 1 at Discogs (list of releases)

1987 albums
Peter Frohmader albums